Island City  is a 2015 Indian drama film written and directed by Ruchika Oberoi. It was screened in the Venice Days section at the 72nd Venice International Film Festival, where Oberoi won the FEDORA prize for the Best Young Director. It was released in India on 2 September 2016.

Cast 

 Vinay Pathak as Suyash Chaturvedi 	 
 Tannishta Chatterjee as Aarti 	 
 Amruta Subhash as Sarita Joshi 	 
 Chandan Roy Sanyal as Jignesh   	 
 Samir Kochhar as Purshottam 	 
 Ashwin Mushran as CEO Ajay Sharma  
 Sana Amin Sheikh as Vaidehi 
 Uttara Baokar as Ajji
 Daisy khatri

Reception

Critical reception 
Devarsi Ghosh of India Today called it "a very well-made, confident film that fearlessly eschews Bollywoodisms and just exists in its distinctive rhythm; never for a second, feeling the need to shock and impress the audience". Saibal Chatterjee of NDTV gave it a rating of 4 stars out of 5, calling it "absolutely unmissable", also adding "laced with sly wit and captivating storytelling feints, Island City touches heights that Hindi films do only once in a blue moon".

Calling it a "stellar debut film", Sarit Ray of Hindustan Times gave it four stars. Kunal Guha of Mumbai Mirror rated it 3.5 stars, adding "Island City is a compelling watch".

Renuka Vyavahare of The Times of India declared "... this one deserves to be watched for its riveting take on love, longing and loneliness" while rating it 3.5 stars.

References

External links 

2015 films
2015 drama films
Indian drama films
Films set in Mumbai
2010s Hindi-language films
Hindi-language drama films